United Nations Security Council Resolution 167, adopted on October 25, 1961, after examining the application of the Islamic Republic of Mauritania for membership in the United Nations the Council recommended to the General Assembly that the Islamic Republic of Mauritania be admitted.

The resolution was approved with nine votes in favour and one against from the United Arab Republic; the Soviet Union abstained.

See also
List of United Nations Security Council Resolutions 101 to 200 (1953–1965)

References
Text of the Resolution at undocs.org

External links
 

 0167
 0167
 0167
1961 in Mauritania
October 1961 events